HMS Tenacious was a T-class destroyer of the Royal Navy that saw service during the Second World War. She was built by Cammell Laird, of Birkenhead and launched on 24 March 1943.

War service
The ship served from 1943 to 1944 in the Mediterranean (where she shared in the sinking of U-boat U-453 and also several E-boats), and the Aegean and Greek islands. The destroyer also took part in the liberation of France as support bombardment for the invasion of the South of France in July–August, 1944.
HMS Tenacious was seconded to serve in East Indies Fleet, as part of the escort force of the 21st Aircraft Carrier Squadron in 1944–5, against the Japanese, then came under the command of the 3rd US Pacific fleet (Admiral Bull Halsey), and given a temporary pennant number D46 to enable identification by US naval forces. The R45 took part in bombardment of Truk in the Caroline Islands and bombardment of Japan. HMS Tenacious was part of the fleet assembled to witness surrender of Japanese in Tokyo harbour, then took part in the repatriation of POWs from Hammamatsu. The ship continued to serve in Australian waters and South China Sea, and rescued six RAAF personnel in S. China Sea, who had ditched their C-47 aircraft after both engines failed, on 4 January 1946. 

She returned to Devonport in 1946 and was mothballed for future use.

Postwar service
Between 1946 and 1949 Tenacious was held in reserve at Devonport. On 23 January 1949 she arrived in Mersey for a refit and in November of that year was commissioned as a target ship for the 3rd Submarine Flotilla at Rothesay. 

Between January 1951 and 1952 she was converted at Rosyth to a Type 16 fast anti-submarine frigate, with the new pennant number F44. On 8 May 1952, she ran aground in the River Foyle in Northern Ireland. In 1953 she took part in the Fleet Review to celebrate the Coronation of Queen Elizabeth II.

In 1954 Tenacious was placed in reserve at Rosyth, then in 1956 into reserve at Barrow. In September 1963 she was towed to Plymouth. Tenacious was subsequently sold for scrapping in 1965 and arrived at Troon for breaking up on 29 June in that year.

References

Publications
 
 
 
 
 Anonymous H.M.S. Tenacious: Her Story, printed without date by Richard Clay and Company, Ltd, Bungay, Suffolk.

 

S and T-class destroyers
Ships built on the River Mersey
1943 ships
World War II destroyers of the United Kingdom
Cold War destroyers of the United Kingdom
Type 16 frigates
Cold War frigates of the United Kingdom
Maritime incidents in 1952